Lamb's Cottage was a short-lived, original railway station on the Liverpool and Manchester Railway to the southeast of Astley village in what was then the county of Lancashire, England.

History

Lamb's Cottage shows on the OS map surveyed in 1845 and published in 1848 at the point where a footpath running NW to SE crosses the railway. The footpath remained in place in 2015.

The station was in the general area of Chat Moss which was then very sparsely populated. It remained sparsely populated in 2015. A narrow gauge tramway can be seen on the 1848 map running north north west from the River Irwell at Boysnope, terminating at Lamb's Cottage station's eastern neighbour, Barton Moss (1st) station, shown on the map as "Barton Station". This tramway was part of an early scheme to bring in manure and human excrement to "improve" the Moss. Later schemes greatly expanded this enterprise, which had the intended effect of turning land from unproductive to very fertile.

In 1908 work started to sink Astley Green Colliery and to build a line southwards to the Liverpool to Manchester line to take its coal to customers. This involved using Stephenson's method of floating the ballast and tracks on wood and brush. The line was completed by 1914, making a triangular junction on Lamb's Cottage's station site, obliterating what little evidence remained. That line and junction continued in use until 1970 and has since been lifted.

Modern times
By 2015 no trace of the station survived. The Stephensons' masterpiece had been electrified and provided a service in their spirit.

References

Sources

External links
The station via Disused Stations UK
The station site on a 1948 OS Map via npe maps
The station on an 1849 OS map via National Library of Scotland
The station site on an 1888-1913 OS map via National Library of Scotland
The line and mileages via railwaycodes
The impact on lowland mires via DEFRA
Chat Moss tramways via Unrecorded
Chat Moss railways via Unrecorded

Disused railway stations in the Metropolitan Borough of Wigan
Former London and North Western Railway stations
Railway stations in Great Britain opened in 1830
Railway stations in Great Britain closed in 1842